Khalid Bin Mohammed Stadium is a multi-use stadium in Sharjah, United Arab Emirates. It is currently used mostly for football matches and is the home ground of Al Shaab Club. The stadium holds 12,000 people.

References

Football venues in the United Arab Emirates
Sport in Sharjah (city)